Uhlířské Janovice is a town in Kutná Hora District in the Central Bohemian Region of the Czech Republic. It has about 3,100 inhabitantas.

Administrative parts
Villages of Bláto, Janovická Lhota, Kochánov, Malejovice, Mitrov, Opatovice II and Silvánka are administrative parts of Uhlířské Janovice.

Geography
It lies in the Upper Sázava Hills. The Výrovka River springs here and flows across the municipal territory.

History
The first written mention of Uhlířské Janovice is from 1352. It was founded by Jan of Sternberg, probably in 1250. The town was owned by the Sternberg family until 1750, when it was merged with the Rataje estate.

Sights

There are three churches. The landmark of the town square is the Church of Saint Aloysius. It was built in the late Baroque style in 1767–1795.

The Church of Saint Giles dates from the late 12th or early 13th century. It is a small Romanesque-Gothic church, which lost its function after the new church was built on the square.

The Church of Saint George in Malejovice is originally an early Gothic building, which probably dates from the 13th century. Baroque modifications were made in 1713.

The former synagogue dates from 1798. Today the building is used as the prayer house of the Czechoslovak Hussite Church.

The town hall on the town square dates from 1786.

Notable people
Friedrich Ritter von Friedländer-Malheim (1825–1901), Bohemian-Austrian painter

References

External links

Cities and towns in the Czech Republic
Populated places in Kutná Hora District
Shtetls